Richardson Glacier is in Wenatchee National Forest in the U.S. state of Washington and is on the south slopes Luahna Peak and north slopes of Clark Mountain. Richardson Glacier is connected to Clark Glacier to the east at its upper margins. Richardson Glacier is named after J.B. Richardson, an early settler to the region.

See also
List of glaciers in the United States

References

Glaciers of the North Cascades
Glaciers of Chelan County, Washington
Glaciers of Washington (state)